The Cabinet of Björn Þórðarson was formed 16 December 1942.

Cabinets

Inaugural cabinet

Change (22 December 1942)

Change (19 April 1943)

See also 

1942 establishments in Iceland
1944 disestablishments in Iceland
Bjorn Thordarson, Cabinet of
Cabinets established in 1942
Cabinets disestablished in 1944